Charles Gasham "Gristmill" Jones (November 3, 1856 – March 29, 1911) was an American urban developer and politician in the U.S. state of Oklahoma. Jones was responsible for bringing electrical power to downtown Oklahoma City and developing a railroad line between Sapulpa, Oklahoma, and Oklahoma City. The town of Jones, Oklahoma, is named for him.

Early life
Jones was born in Greenup, Illinois, on November 3, 1856, and arrived in Oklahoma Territory in 1889.

Career

Urban development 
After arriving in Oklahoma Territory, Jones organized the construction of a canal to bring electrical power to downtown Oklahoma City and constructed the first flour mill in Oklahoma Territory. In 1895, Jones and Henry Overholser organized the St. Louis and Oklahoma City Railroad Company and, in 1898, constructed a line from Sapulpa to Oklahoma City. The town of Jones, Oklahoma, was named for Charles G. Jones and was platted by a friend, Luther F. Aldrich, in 1898. Jones owned a farmstead in the town, which is today listed in the National Register of Historic Places.

The post office for the town of Elgin, Oklahoma was originally named "Ceegee, Oklahoma" using Charles G. Jones initials, when it was established in April 1902. However, after Post Office management intervened in August 1902, the name was changed to Elgin.

The statehood movement had begun and Jones served as chair of the Single Statehood Executive Committee that first met in 1903 and lobbied for three years for the successful passage of the Oklahoma Enabling Act, which created the state of Oklahoma.

Political career
A Republican, Jones was elected to the 1st, 5th and 6th Oklahoma Territorial Legislatures, representing Oklahoma County, served two terms as the mayor of Oklahoma City in 1896 and 1897 and 1901 to 1903 and was elected to the 2nd Oklahoma State Legislature.

Death
Charles Jones died of a stomach hemorrhage on March 29, 1911, at his homestead in Jones, Oklahoma.

Notes

References

1856 births
1911 deaths
People from Greenup, Illinois
Republican Party members of the Oklahoma House of Representatives
Mayors of Oklahoma City
19th-century American politicians